Thomas Forrest (c. 1729 – c. 1802) was a Scottish navigator who worked for the British East India Company.

Life

He appears to have served for some time in the Royal Navy, and to have been a midshipman in 1745. Passages in his own writings show that he was employed in Indian waters from 1753 almost continuously. He implies that during part of the Seven Years' War he was on the Elizabeth, in the squadron under Admiral Charles Steevens; but this cannot be verified from the pay-book.

In 1762 Forrest had command of a Company ship. In 1770 he was engaged in forming the new settlement at Balambangan which had been recommended by Alexander Dalrymple, and in 1774 he led an exploring mission in the direction of New Guinea. He sailed on 9 December in the Tartar, a garay boat from Sulu of about ten tons burden, with two English officers and a crew of eighteen Malays. In this, accompanied during part of the time by two small boats, he pushed his explorations as far as Geelvink Bay in New Guinea, examining the Sulu Archipelago, the south coast of Mindanao, Mandiolo, Batchian, and particularly Waigeo, of which his was the first good chart. Forrest reached Dorei Harbour, and returned to Achin (present-day Aceh) in March 1776.

In December 1782 Forrest was tasked by governor-general Warren Hastings to gain intelligence of the French fleet, which had left the coast of India and had eluded Sir Edward Hughes the English commander-in-chief. The British surmised that the French were headed for Mauritius; Forrest spotted the ships near Achin and returned the information to Vizagapatam just ahead of the French return. In the following June he sailed again to survey the Andaman Islands, but falling to leeward of them, passed through the Preparis Channel to the Tenasserim coast, which he examined southwards as far as Quedah. In 1790 he made a more thorough examination of the same coast and of its offshore islands, which lay in a long row, leaving a 125-mile-long sheltered passage between them and the mainland. He christened that stretch Forrest Strait.

Forrest is said to have died in India about 1802.

Works
A detailed account of Forrest's 1774 voyage was published in 1779 under the title, A Voyage to New Guinea and the Moluccas from Balambangan … during the years 1774–5–6; the volume included a portrait of the author. In 1782 Forrest published at Calcutta A Treatise on the Monsoons in East India, a new edition of which was published in London in 1783.

An account of the first survey voyage came out in 1789 under the title, A Journal of the Esther Brig, Capt. Thomas Forrest, from Bengal to Quedah, in 1783, later edited by Dalrymple, with publishing costs borne by the East India Company. An account of the second survey voyage was published in 1792 as A Voyage from Calcutta to the Mergui Archipelago, with which were included some minor essays and descriptive accounts, as well as a reprint of the Treatise on the Monsoons. This volume is dedicated to William Aldersey, president of the board of trade in Bengal, who was described as Forrest's cousin.

Notes

References
 
 

1729 births
1802 deaths
English sailors
British navigators
British East India Company people
Deaths in Indonesia